New Orleans Center for Creative Arts, or NOCCA, is the regional, pre-professional arts training center for high school students in Louisiana. NOCCA opened in 1973 as a professional arts training center for secondary school-age children. Located in New Orleans, it provides intensive instruction in culinary arts, creative writing, dance, media arts, music (classical, jazz, vocal), theatre arts (drama, musical theatre, theatre design), and visual arts.

NOCCA was founded by a group of artists, educators, business leaders, and community activists. Tuition is free to all Louisiana students who meet audition requirements. Students from over 100 public, private, parochial and home schools attend in the afternoon or late-day as well as Academic Studio students who attend NOCCA for the full day. 

In 2000, NOCCA moved to a campus in the Faubourg Marigny neighborhood. Before that, NOCCA was housed for many years in an old elementary school building on Perrier Street in Uptown New Orleans.

Curriculum

NOCCA students receive pre-professional arts training in one of eleven different arts disciplines, and additionally may participate in a full-day academic program, the Academic Studio.

 Classical Instrumental Music
 Creative Writing 
 Culinary Arts
 Dance
 Drama
 Entertainment Production Design
 Jazz
 Media Arts
 Musical Theatre 
 Visual Arts
 Vocal music 

Launched in the fall of 2011, NOCCA's Academic Studio is a full-day, diploma-granting attendance option. To enroll in the Academic Studio, prospective students must successfully complete an arts audition and be accepted into a Level I program in one of NOCCA's eleven arts disciplines.

Admissions process
NOCCA acceptance is by audition only.

Notable alumni

 Musician Troy "Trombone Shorty" Andrews
 Musician Jon Batiste
 Artist Gustave Blache III
 Musician Terence Blanchard
 Dancer Bella Blue
 Musician and actor Harry Connick Jr.
 Novelist and poet Nicole Cooley
 Writer Lolis Eric Elie
 Musician Donald Harrison
 Actress JoNell Kennedy
 Musician Doreen Ketchens
 Actor Anthony Mackie
 Musicians Branford, Wynton, Delfeayo, and Jason Marsalis
 Conductor Paul Mauffray
 Musician Paul Meany
 Musician Jeffery Miller
 Rap Artist 3D Na'Tee
 Musician Nicholas Payton
 Actor Wendell Pierce
 Musician Nick Sanders
 Musician Christian Scott aTunde Adjuah
 Filmmaker Phillip Youmans

NOCCA Foundation
The NOCCA Foundation is NOCCA’s nonprofit partner, providing supplemental funding for NOCCA and advocacy for its world-class program. Some of the Foundation’s more notable endeavors include: a Student Success Program that pays for students’ classroom supplies as well as fees associated with important summer training programs across the country; an Artists-in-Residence Program that brings more than 100 professional visiting artists into NOCCA’s classrooms each year; the capital campaign for NOCCA’s current home and expansion projects like Press Street Gardens; a wide array of arts classes for adults; and concert, gallery, and literary events for the community. The Foundation also oversees rentals of the NOCCA campus, making it available to arts organizations, individuals, corporations, and other groups.

References

External links

 Official website
The NOCCA Institute

Art schools in Louisiana
Culture of New Orleans
Charter schools in New Orleans
Faubourg Marigny
Public high schools in New Orleans
Schools of the performing arts in the United States
Educational institutions established in 1973
1973 establishments in Louisiana